Miall is a surname, and may refer to:

 Bernard Miall (1876-1953), British translator
 Edward Miall (1809–1881), English journalist, founder of the Liberation Society and politician
 Leonard Miall (1914–2005), BBC broadcaster and administrator
 Louis Compton Miall (1842–1921), English palaeontologist and biologist 
 Sally Miall (1918–2010), British rally driver and novelist, and a codebreaker at Bletchley Park